al-Abbas or Abbas is an Arabic name that goes back to al-Abbas ibn Abd al-Muttalib, an uncle of the Islamic prophet Muhammad.

al-Abbas may refer to:
 al-Abbas ibn Abd al-Muttalib (c. 566–653), a paternal uncle and companion of the Islamic prophet Muhammad; forefather of the Abbasids.
 al-Abbas ibn Ali (c. 647–680), a son of Ali ibn Abi Talib.
 al-Abbas ibn al-Walid (died 750), an Umayyad prince and General, the son of caliph al-Walid I. He fought in the Arab–Byzantine wars of the early 8th century.
 al-Abbas ibn al-Ma'mun (died 838), an Abbasid prince and general, the son of caliph al-Ma'mun. He fought in the Arab–Byzantine wars of the 9th century.
 al-Abbas ibn Musa (died 815), a member of the Abbasid Cadet branch. He held various posts in the Abbasid Empire during the late eighth and early ninth centuries.
 al-Abbas ibn al-Hadi, son of the Abbasid caliph al-Hadi.
 al-Abbas ibn al-Musta'in, son of the Abbasid caliph al-Musta'in and governor of Armenia.
 al-Abbas ibn al-Mu'tamid, son of the Abbasid caliph al-Mu'tamid.
 al-Abbas ibn al-Mu'tadid, son of the Abbasid caliph al-Mu'tadid.
 al-Abbas ibn al-Radi, son of the Abbasid caliph al-Radi.